Sun Bin (Simplified Chinese: 孙彬) (born 25 April 1985 in Qingdao) is a Chinese football player.

Club career

Shandong Luneng
A product of the Shandong Luneng youth system Sun Bin would graduate through their various youth teams, however he was never able to make any senior level appearance for Shandong Luneng and despite several seasons with Shandong he was allowed to leave.

Qingdao Jonoon
He transferred to top tier club Qingdao Jonoon at the beginning of the 2006 Chinese league season with Cha Kejun, Zhou Yi and An Shuai. Within the campaign Sun would soon make his debut for the club on March 25, 2006 in a league game against Shanghai Shenhua, which Qingdao lost 2–1.

References

External links
Player stats at sohu.com

1985 births
Living people
Chinese footballers
Footballers from Qingdao
Qingdao Hainiu F.C. (1990) players
Shandong Taishan F.C. players
Chinese Super League players
Association football defenders